General elections were held in Cameroon on 24 April 1988 to elect a President and National Assembly. The country was a one-party state at the time, with the Cameroon People's Democratic Movement as the sole legal party. Its leader, incumbent Paul Biya was the only candidate in the presidential election, and was re-elected unopposed. 

For the first time since 1960 voters had a choice of candidates in the National Assembly election, with two or more CPDM candidates contesting each constituency, and a total of 324 candidates running for the 180 seats in the enlarged Assembly. Nevertheless, the CPDM won all 180 seats with a 90.3% turnout.

Results

President

National Assembly

References

Cameroon
1988 in Cameroon
Elections in Cameroon
One-party elections
Single-candidate elections
Presidential elections in Cameroon
April 1988 events in Africa